Andrew Mawson may refer to:

 Andrew Mawson, Baron Mawson (born 1954), English social entrepreneur
 Andrew Mawson (cricketer) (born 1974), English cricketer